Peyman Nasiri Bazanjani (born 10 June 1980) is a Paralympic athlete from Iran who competes in T20 classification middle-distance running events. Nasiri Bazanjani represented Iran at the 2012 Summer Paralympics in London, where he won Gold in the 1500 m race. He is also a two-time winner of the 1,500 m race at the IPC World Championships, in Christchurch in 2011 and in Lyon in 2013.

References 

Paralympic athletes of Iran
Athletes (track and field) at the 2012 Summer Paralympics
Athletes (track and field) at the 2016 Summer Paralympics
Paralympic gold medalists for Iran
Paralympic bronze medalists for Iran
Living people
1980 births
Iranian male middle-distance runners
Medalists at the 2012 Summer Paralympics
Medalists at the 2016 Summer Paralympics
Paralympic medalists in athletics (track and field)
21st-century Iranian people
Medalists at the 2014 Asian Para Games
Medalists at the 2018 Asian Para Games